Marie Redd is a United States politician from the state of West Virginia. Redd was a Democratic West Virginia State Senator from the 5th district, which contains Cabell County and a small portion of Wayne County. In 1998, she defeated incumbent Republican Thomas F. Scott in the general election, thereby becoming the first African-American state senator in West Virginia history. Redd lost to Evan Jenkins in the 2002 Democratic primary election and again in 2006.

Personal 
Marie Redd is married to attorney William Redd and they have two children, Lemarquis and D'Ann Redd. Prior to her election to the West Virginia Senate in 1998, Redd was an associate professor of criminal justice at Marshall University and worked at the IBM Corporation for 18 years. Redd was an unsuccessful candidate for the Cabell County Commission in 2014. She was named a West Virginia Wonder Woman by West Virginia Living Magazine in 2020.

References

External links
Analysis of Redd's campaigns in 1998 and 2002.

Democratic Party West Virginia state senators
Women state legislators in West Virginia
African-American state legislators in West Virginia
African-American women in politics
Politicians from Huntington, West Virginia
Living people
African-American history of West Virginia
Year of birth missing (living people)
21st-century African-American people
21st-century African-American women